Bonze Adventure, known in Japan as , is a platform game released in arcades in 1988. It was later ported to the PC Engine by Taito.

Plot

Emma the King has lost his senses, causing him to lose order of his Underworld domain – enabling evil entities to roam freely. The player controls Bonze Kackremboh, a Buddhist priest who is son of the Divine Dragon. Kackremboh must now go on a journey to find and confront Emma. In order to find Emma, Bonze must survive against hordes of yokai, such as snakes, giant eyeballs, ghosts, kitsune, spiders, entities appearing to be hitodama/will-o'-the-wisp, as well as other evils.

Gameplay
The priest's weapons are Buddhist prayer beads, called "mala" beads, which can be powered up until they become almost as large as the priest himself. In times of difficulty, a deva often provides various power-ups to assist the priest's progress. In an unusual twist, the allotted time appears in the manner of melting candles, rather than a traditional timer. The game consists of several rounds: Dilapidated Backyard Cemetery, The Dead-or-Alive River, Burning Inferno, Bloody Pond, Glacier Trap, Lose-Your-Way-Maze, and finally Emma's Lair.

Reception 
In Japan, Game Machine listed Bonze Adventure on their July 15, 1988 issue as being the third most-successful table arcade unit of the month.

Bonze Kackremboh later made an appearance in the Let's! TV Play Classic series in Kiki Kaikai Kackremboh.

References

External links

1988 video games
Side-scrolling platform games
TurboGrafx-16 games
Video games developed in Japan
Virtual Console games
Taito arcade games
Video games based on Buddhist mythology
Video games set in cemeteries